The Brown River is a tributary of the Depot River, flowing in Quebec, Canada, in the municipality of Saint-Adalbert, in L'Islet Regional County Municipality, in the administrative region of Chaudière-Appalaches, and in Aroostook County, Maine, United States, in Township T13 R16 Wels, in the North Maine Woods. Its course runs entirely through forested region in a plain in Quebec and in a valley south of the Canada-US border.

The upper hydrographic watershed of the Brown River is accessible in Quebec by the road of 5th range West, Route 204 West, Bélanger Road and 8th range West. The segment flowing in Maine is accessible by forest roads along the Depot River.

Geography 

The source of the river Brown begins with a mountain stream in Saint-Adalbert, Quebec. This source is located at:
  at Northwest of the border between Quebec and Maine;
  at Northwest from the village center of Saint-Adalbert, Quebec;
  at Southwest of the confluence of the "River Brown".

River Brown Headwaters (segment of  flowing in Quebec)

  to the South in Saint-Adalbert, Quebec, forming a curve to the west, until the route 204;
  Eastward passing at the North of the "Bellevue Mountain" up to the road of the Mountain;
  to the Southeast, up to the road of 8th range West;
  to the Southeast, up to the Canada-US border.

Lower river courses Brown (segment de  flowing in the Maine)

  to the southeast in a small valley basin, then in a plain to the confluence of the river.

This confluence is located:
  to the southeast of the Canada-US border;
  to the Southwest of the confluence of the Big Black River (Saint John River).

"The River Brown" pours on the west bank of the Depot River which flows North, South East and North again, up to the Big Black River (Saint John River), in Aroostook County. The latter flows Northeast zigzagging up to a river bend of Saint John River where it pours on the West bank. It flows to the East, then Southeast through all the New Brunswick and pours on the North bank of the Bay of Fundy which opens to the Southwest on the Atlantic Ocean.

Toponymy

The place name "rivière Brown" was formalized on December 5, 1968, at the Commission de toponymie du Québec (Quebec Places Names Board).

See also 

 Saint-Adalbert, Quebec, a municipality of Quebec
 L'Islet Regional County Municipality, an RCM in Quebec
 Aroostook County, a county in Maine
 Depot River, one of the rivers in Maine
 Big Black River (Saint John River), a stream
 Saint John River (Bay of Fundy), a stream
 North Maine Woods, a geographical region of Maine
 List of rivers of Quebec
 List of rivers of Maine

References

Bibliography

External links 
  Maine Streamflow USGS data
  Maine Watershed data from the Environmental Protection Agency

Rivers of Chaudière-Appalaches
Tributaries of the Saint John River (Bay of Fundy)
Rivers of Aroostook County, Maine
North Maine Woods
International rivers of North America